Michael von Dincklage (born 21 June 1978 in Auckland) is a former New Zealand-born Samoan rugby union player. He played as a lock.

Career
He was present in the 2003 Rugby World Cup roster, although he never played any game in the tournament. His only international cap was against Scotland, at Wellington, on 4 June 2004.

External links

Mike von Dincklage at New Zealand Rugby History

1978 births
Living people
Rugby union players from Auckland
Samoan people of German descent
New Zealand sportspeople of Samoan descent
Samoan rugby union players
Rugby union locks
Samoa international rugby union players